The Mount Oku rat (Lamottemys okuensis) is a species of rodent in the family Muridae. The genus Lamottemys is monotypic, and this is the only species. It is found only in Cameroon where its natural habitat is subtropical or tropical moist montane forests. It is threatened by habitat destruction.

Description 
The dorsal fur is glossy and soft, dark brownish-black tinged with russet, with no stripe along the spine. The individual hairs are dark grey, banded with ochre and with black tips, and there are numerous longer, black guard hairs. The underparts are yellowish-grey, the hairs having grey bases and yellowish tips. The limbs are yellowish-brown, with four digits on the front feet and five digits on the hind. The tail is about the same length as the body, and is covered with scales and small black bristles.

Distribution and habitat 
It is unclear whether it can adapt to secondary growth forest.

Ecology 
This species is probably herbivorous and terrestrial, based on its body proportions. One female captured in the dry season (January) contained a single developing embryo, so litter sizes may be low. Genets and mongooses are likely to be predators of this rat, and it is also hunted for food by local villagers.

Status 
The International Union for Conservation of Nature has assessed its conservation status as being "endangered", based on the continuing degradation of the forest, parts of which are being cleared for agricultural purposes.

References 

Old World rats and mice
Rodents of Africa
Mammals described in 1986
Endemic fauna of Cameroon
Fauna of the Cameroonian Highlands forests